Stephen Spence Clark (born August 2, 1960) is a former professional American football player who played defensive tackle and offensive guard for five seasons for the Miami Dolphins of the National Football League (NFL).

Biography

Clark played on two state championship teams in high school at Skyline High School in Salt Lake City, which were a combined 25–1 over two years and was a five team all-American including Parade magazine. He was also named Most Valuable Player of the state of Utah. He went on to play college football for the Utah Utes of the University of Utah. There, he was named two-time All-Western Athletic Conference (WAC) defensive tackle, Defensive Most Valuable Player of the WAC, and First-team All-American. He also played in the East-West Shrine Game and was named co-MVP of the 1982 Senior Bowl.

In the 1982 NFL Draft, Clark was select by Don Shula and the Miami Dolphins. During Clark's second year in the NFL, he played both ways (offense and defense) in a preseason game, and Coach Shula knew he had a player that could back up every position on the offensive and defensive line as well as long snap. He earned a starting position at right guard and played against William Perry when the Dolphins beat the Chicago Bears on Monday Night Football to help keep the 1972 Dolphins as the only team with a perfect season in NFL history. Clark also played on two Super Bowl teams with the Dolphins and was the starting right guard before being injured. Clark was named one of the top 100 greatest players in the history of the University of Utah, placing ninth on the list.

References 

1960 births
Living people
Players of American football from Salt Lake City
American football defensive ends
American football offensive guards
American football defensive tackles
Utah Utes football players
Miami Dolphins players